The Torpedo Service (Torpedodienst) was the branch of the Royal Netherlands Navy dealing with torpedoes and (until 1907, when the Mine Service split off from it) mines. It was set up in 1870 and originally manned all the navy's small ships, including the submarine O 1 (the Dutch Submarine Service arose from it), accounting for 1000 personnel in 1914. This dropped to 500 after the Second World War and in 1978, when the last mechanical torpedo (the Mark 8) in use by the Dutch Navy was phased out and replaced by electric torpedoes, the Service was disestablished.

Royal Netherlands Navy
1870 establishments in the Netherlands
1978 disestablishments
Military units and formations established in 1870